Dame Alice Kyteler (1263 – after 1325) was the first recorded person condemned for witchcraft in Ireland. She fled the country to either England or Flanders, and there is no record of her after her escape from persecution. Her servant Petronilla de Meath (also spelt Petronella) was flogged and burned to death at the stake on 3 November 1324, after being tortured and confessing to the heretical crimes she, Kyteler, and Kyteler's followers were alleged to have committed.

Life
Kyteler was born in Kyteler's House, in County Kilkenny, Ireland. She was the only child of a Flemish family of merchants settled in Ireland in the mid- to late thirteenth century. She was married four times, to William Outlaw, Adam le Blund, Richard de Valle, and Sir John le Poer.
 First husband c.1280–85: William Outlaw, wealthy merchant and moneylender from Kilkenny. Son: William Outlaw, was mayor of Kilkenny in 1305. Daughter: Rose?
 Second husband (by 1302): Adam Blund of Callan, moneylender. Had children from a previous marriage
 Third husband (by 1309): Richard de Valle, a wealthy landholder of County Tipperary. After de Valle's death c.1316, Kyteler took proceedings against one of her stepsons, Richard, for the recovery of her widow's dower. This act incited the suspicion and anger of her stepchildren, as they would have received the money had she not intervened.
 Fourth husband (c.1316–24): John le Poer. He had children from a previous marriage.

In 1302, Kyteler and her second husband were briefly accused of killing her first husband. She incurred local resentment because of her vast wealth and involvement in moneylending. Her fourth husband, John le Poer, briefly defended her by imprisoning Richard de Ledrede, the Bishop of Ossory, who was attempting to arrest Kyteler. However, when le Poer fell ill in 1324, he expressed the suspicion that he was being poisoned. After his death, the children of le Poer and of her previous three husbands, her step-children, accused her of using poison and sorcery (maleficarum) against their fathers and of favouring her first-born son, William Outlaw.

Seven formal charges were brought against Kyteler. She was accused of:
 Denying the power of Christ and of the Church. During this period, renunciation of faith was interpreted as a shift in worship to the devil.
 Sacrificing animals to the demons Artis Filius and Robin Artisson.
 Asking demons for advice on witchcraft.
 Having a sexual relationship with the incubus Robin Artisson. It was alleged that Robin Artisson often took the form of animals or an Ethiopian when engaging with Kyteler.
 Holding coven meetings and burning candles in the church at night without permission. This group included: Robert of Bristol, Petronilla de Meath, Meath's daughter Sarah, John/Ellen’Syssok Galrussyn, Annota Lange, Eva de Brownstown, William Payn de Boly, and Alice Faver.
 Making dark magic-based powders and ointments or potions, from multiple alarming ingredients, including but not limited to body parts of unbaptized children, worms, a skull, and chicken innards. It was alleged that said potions were used to corrupt her husbands.
 Bewitching and killing her husbands to take their money for herself and her biological son, William Outlaw.

Before sentencing, Kyteler along with Petronilla de Meath's daughter, Basilia, escaped. Although at least 10 other people faced convictions in connection to Kyteler, they did not attempt to escape with their leader. There are no records of her life after her escape. Her date of death is unknown, along with the location of a burial site.

Accusers and their motives

The Husbands 
Kyteler's first three husbands did not raise accusations against her regarding witchcraft or her responsibility for the deaths of her other husbands. Her last husband, John le Poer, only raised suspicions toward her once he developed the sickness that eventually led to his death. He did not mention witchcraft as a potential cause of his and his predecessors' deaths, but rather implied that poisoning was the most plausible cause of his affliction.

Le Poer did not accuse her based on any perceived behaviour change from her, but rather from the physical change in his own health coupled with her previous husbands' unusual deaths.

John le Poer's children 
Shortly before le Poer's death, he edited his will to financially favour Kyteler and her son. Children from his other marriage approached bishop Richard de Ledrede and claimed she had bewitched their father and was a poisoner. The phrase ‘poisoner’ was tied to being a witch because of the connection of herbalism and witchcraft.

Christian Medieval Church and Richard de Ledrede 
As the primary actors during the investigation of Alice Kyteler, the church had the most influence on the outcome of her and her alleged followers' trial. At the time of this trial, the church in Ireland had a secure relationship with the judicial system. The sentence of repentance and self-betterment for Kyteler's son William Outlaw depicts this relationship as religious acts were available means of reform from convictions.

Across Europe during the Middle Ages, it was common to sentence heretics to acts of religious reformation before a death sentence was brought into discussion. The belief was that heresy was comparable to an illness, which could be transferred to others as well as be cured. However, the option for reform was not offered to Kyteler or her maid after the maid confessed, which was highly unusual for the time. It is possible that the preemptive attacks against Richard de Ledrede by Kyteler and her son led to a sentence driven by resentment. The lack of confession from Kyteler herself may have implied a lack of remorse for the crimes she was accused of; however, Meath's confession did not garner her a lenient sentence either. Additionally, William Outlaw failed to produce a confession for the heretical crimes, but did apologize for his attacks against Ledrede before the trial. Outlaw received leniency in his sentence due to his apology to Ledrede, which suggests a degree of personal pride of the bishop likely was present during the sentencing of the other heretics in this case, as they did not make specific apologies to him.

Additionally, although it is likely that Kyteler was responsible for at least a few of her husband's deaths, it would be difficult to persecute her to the highest extent for murder given the precedent of cross-nobility murders in the British Isles. Although murder was very uncommon amongst nobles in England, the rest of the British Isles in the 13th century had a long-lasting tradition of violent noble feuds. What made conviction even more difficult was that English jurors were unlikely to convict an accused murderer in the 13th century, as 63.5% of defendants were acquitted. It is possible that the Bishop de Ledrede and John le Poer's children accused Kyteler of witchcraft in order to secure punishment for her crimes that she would likely have been acquitted for, as witchcraft was a much more taboo topic. Additionally, heresy was considered to be the worst crime that could be committed. This would also explain why the death penalty was applied in this case compared to previous cases against heretics in Europe. What would have made this an even more appealing option for persecution was there was no statute for witchcraft in Ireland at this time, which meant the treatment of the case was tried with ecclesiastical law. Kyteler would be tried as a heretic instead of a felon as English common law would have done.

Kyteler's potential motives

Money 
Kyteler's husbands were all notable wealthy men. When each of them died she received a large sum of their money. She may have married her husbands for love, but Kyteler's speed in remarrying and the speed of her husband's deaths after marriage suggests she was not interested in their company or personalities when she selected them. Considering their common trait was their wealth, this appears to be the most likely motive. This was also considered to be the likely motive from the perspectives of the people of Kilkenny.

Relationship values in Ireland 
Another potential motive was that Kyteler's personal needs were restrained due to patriarchal values in Ireland during her time. There were two approaches to marital laws in Ireland due to discrepancies between the Anglo-Normans and the Gaelic Irish. For both groups, there were limited reasons divorce or an annulment would be approved, which included the prolonged absence of one partner, breakage of a pre-marriage agreement or contract, and impotence, among others. It is possible that Kyteler wanted to leave her husbands but did not meet any of the annulment-worthy complaints, and so resorted to murder instead.

Open displays of sexuality were highly scorned in medieval Ireland. It was considered sinful to take part in or even think of committing such acts, including masturbation. During the investigation of Kyteler's room, a pipe with ointment was found in her nightstand. It has been argued that this item was a dildo. This item being in Kyteler's nightstand suggests that she was comfortable going against the sexual standards of her time. It is possible that her husbands did not satisfy her in this way or approve of her sexuality, which may have led her to try to find a husband who would.

Trial 
Richard de Ledrede, Bishop of Ossory, sought to uphold the laws of the church and morality. When the case was presented before him in 1324, he began his larger project of addressing witchcraft.

Ledrede made initial attempts to have Kyteler arrested, and Kyteler called on the assistance of powerful friends. The bishop wrote to the Chancellor of Ireland, Roger Utlagh (Outlaw), demanding that she be arrested. Using the decretal Ut Inquisitiones (1298), designed to protect the faith, Ledrede demanded that secular powers concede to church wishes, and this point of law became a thorny issue throughout the trial. Kyteler was related to the Chancellor (he was probably her first husband's brother) and he asked the bishop to drop the case. The chancellor demanded that Kyteler be excommunicated for at least 40 days before the trial, which caused a delay in the proceedings. This allowed Kyteler to flee to Roger Utlagh. Ledrede accused Utlagh of harbouring heretics, but a commission cleared him of any wrongdoing. The bishop then charged Kyteler and her son, William Outlaw, with the crime of heresy. William was a powerful man and was related to many in the ruling classes. He called upon his friend, Sir Arnold le Poeur, a Senior Official in Dublin, who had de Ledrede thrown in prison in Kilkenny Castle.

Ledrede, despite his limited political connections compared to his captors, was released from prison after he ordered the diocese be placed on an interdict. He would not allow any religious ceremonies to occur until he was released. On Ledrede's release, he renewed his efforts to have Kyteler imprisoned. Kyteler and her accomplices were accused of and investigated on the seven accounts.

After some months of stalemate, one of Kyteler's servants, Petronilla de Meath, was tortured and confessed to participating in witchcraft. Her confession detailed her involvement, along with Kyteler's, in six out of seven of the above-listed crimes. One example she gave was rubbing ointment on a stick to fly. It would seem, although her testimony was likely forced and unreliable, that the accusers gained most of their information from this confession. Although the testimony did implicate Kyteler in performing heresy, questions concerning Petronella's credibility came to light, especially when examining the contents of her confession. In Ledrede's retelling of Petronilla's confession, he writes:
'On one of these occasions, by the crossroads outside the city, she had made an offering of three cocks to a certain demon whom she called Robert, son of Art (Robertum filium Artis), from the depths of the underworld. She had poured out the cocks' blood, cut the animals into pieces and mixed the intestines with spiders and other black worms like scorpions, with a herb called milfoil as well as with other herbs and horrible worms. She had boiled this mixture in a pot with the brains and clothes of a boy who had died without baptism and with the head of a robber who had been decapitated ... Petronilla said she had several times at Alice's instigation and once in her presence, consulted demons and received answers. She had consented to a pact whereby she would be the medium between Alice and the said Robert, her friend. In public, she said that with her own eyes she had seen the aforesaid demon as three shapes (praedictus daemon tertius), in the form of three black men (aethiopum) each carrying an iron rod in the hand. This apparition happened by daylight (de die) before the said Dame Alice, and, while Petronilla herself was watching, the apparition had intercourse with Alice. After this disgraceful act, with her own hand she (Alice?) wiped clean the disgusting place with sheets (kanevacio) from her own bed.'Despite the clear usage of torture, Ledrede referred to the acts committed against Petronilla as floggings. His assertion that flogging occurred suggests that what she went through was an act of punishment rather than an attempt to gain a confession was potentially an attempt to give credibility to her statements.

Additionally, the credibility of the physical evidence used against Kyteler was dubious. Investigators cited a ‘pipe of ointment’ found in Kyteler's room as evidence for the sixth charge. However, it is most likely that what they found was actually a dildo.

It is said Kyteler fled to England. She appears no further in contemporary records. The Bishop continued to pursue her working-class associates, bringing charges of witchcraft against them. Petronilla de Meath was flogged and burned at the stake on 3 November 1324. Petronella's daughter, Basilia, fled with Kyteler. Kyteler's son, William Outlaw, was also accused inter alia, of heresy, usury, perjury, adultery, and clericide. Multiple courts refused to try the case, but he was eventually convicted, excommunicated, and briefly imprisoned. Outlaw was released after he begged for forgiveness from Ledrede. Additionally, he was able to reverse his excommunication by visiting the Holy Land while following specific rules.

Chronology of events 
 c.1280—Alice Kyteler marries her first husband William Outlaw.
 1302—Alice and her second husband, Adam le Blund, are accused of homicide.
 c.1316—Alice's third husband, Richard de Valle, dies and she sues his heir for the widow's share.
 1317 April—Pope John XXII appoints Richard de Ledrede as Bishop of Ossory.
 October—De Ledrede arrives in Ossory and holds a synod.
 1320 August—John XXII sends a letter to the justiciar of Ireland regarding complaints of harassment and imprisonment made by Ledrede.
 1324—Ledrede accuses Alice Kyteler and her associates of witchcraft and heresy.
 March/April—Arnold le Poer imprisons Ledrede for 17 days.
 Dublin parliament; the magnates, including Arnold le Poer and Maurice FitzThomas, swear to discipline their own people and followers (lineages).
 Arrest of heretics by Ledrede.
 November—Petronilla of Meath burnt for heresy and witchcraft.
 William Outlaw's penance payment is guaranteed by the magnates.
 1325 January -- Alexander Bicknor deserts to the queen's party while on an embassy to France.
 1326—The feud between the le Poers and Maurice FitzThomas worsens.
 Maurice FitzThomas and John le Poer, baron of Donoil, are allowed four months to discipline their followers; Arnold le Poer goes to England.
 1327 January—Deposition of Edward II by Queen Isabella and Roger Mortimer.
 1327/8 -- Ledrede appeals to Isabella and is given permission to come to court but fails to use it, later claiming that Bicknor and Outlaw had closed the ports against him.
 Arnold is confirmed as seneschal of Kilkenny and given custody of Kilkenny Castle.
 The "Munster war" breaks out between the le Poers and Maurice. A jury later claims Ledrede attended a meeting to coordinate Maurice's "rebellion."
 Ledrede is alleged to have instigated an attack on the le Poer castle of Moytobir.
 1328 -- Adam Duff O'Toole burnt for heresy
 Justiciar orders the magnates to stop fighting
 Arnold returns. Ledrede charges him with heresy and has him imprisoned in Dublin Castle.
 Ledrede sends a petition to court complaining of his treatment by Arnold.
 The justiciar, Thomas FitzJohn, sends the king an indictment of Ledrede by the people of Ossory, seizes his temporalities and summons him to Dublin.
 1329 January—Roger Outlaw purges himself at the Dublin parliament of Ledrede's heresy accusations.
 March—Arnold dies in prison.
 Archbishop Bicknor summons Ledrede to Dublin to answer charges of aiding and abetting heretics.
 June—Ledrede flees Ireland and England, ignoring a royal summons to appear before the king. Writs are issued for his arrest.
 Edward III warns John XXII against Ledrede. Bicknor excommunicates Ledrede.
 1330 October—Edward III seizes control from his mother and Mortimer. He sends further letters warning the Pope against Ledrede.
 1331 May—At the request of the papacy, Edward III restores Ledrede's temporalities.
 1332—The cathedral roof paid for by William Outlaw collapses during a storm.
 A jury accuses Ledrede of having conspired to support Maurice in his "rebellion" of 1327.
 The dean and chapter claim Ledrede purged himself of rebellion at the Kilkenny parliament of 1328.
 1333—Ledrede returns to England; the Pope urges Edward III to assist him and other Irish prelates against heretics.
 John XXII writes to the Archbishop of Cashel ordering him to promulgate in his province a processus pontificum against heretics.
 1335 November—Pope Benedict XII writes to Edward III on behalf of Ledrede.
 1339 June—Edward III orders the writs against Ledrede to be revoked.
 September—Edward III orders the escheator of Kilkenny to obey the writ issued in July restoring Ledrede's temporalities.
 Roger Outlaw dies while holding office as deputy judicier; Bicknor succeeds him.
 1341 February—Ledrede sends a petition to the king claiming that Bicknor had planned to murder him in 1329.
 1343—Bicknor is cited by the papacy for impeding Ledrede in his prosecution of heretics.
 Ossory is exempted from the jurisdiction of Dublin. The papacy orders an inquiry into Bicknor's protection of heretics.
 1347 April—Ledrede receives a royal pardon and secures his temporalities back from the king; he returns to his diocese.
 1349 July—Death of Alexander Bicknor.
 Restoration of Ossory to the jurisdiction of Dublin.
 1351—Ledrede refuses a royal tax on the clergy, the 1347 pardon is revoked and the temporalities resumed.
 1355—Ledrede is granted a royal pardon and his temporalities restored. He is accused of instigating a violent attack on a priory.
 1356/7 -- The English chancellor, John Thoresby, Archbishop of York, drafts a letter to the pope asking for Ledrede's removal, accusing him of senility, madness, and persecuting his parishioners.
 1360—Ledrede dies.

Significance
In the late thirteenth and fourteenth century, heresy was considered as evidence of the struggle with the devil, with the "dangers" of witchcraft voiced by the papacy in Avignon.

Pope John XXII listed witchcraft as heresy in his bull Super illius specula. Kyteler's was one of the first European witchcraft trials and followed closely on the election of this pope (1316–1334).

Kyteler's case appears to involve the first recorded claim of a witch lying with her incubus. Annales Hiberniae state that:
Ricardus Ledered, episcopus Ossoriensis, citavit Aliciam Ketil, ut se purgaret de heretica pravitate; quae magiae convicta est, nam certo comprobatum est, quendam demonem incubum (nomine Robin Artisson) concubuisse cum ea ... – that is, that Kyteler had intercourse with a demon named as "Robin Artisson". This case was also the first to treat the accused parties as an organized group or coven as opposed to individuals. Additionally, it was the first cased of convicted heresy resulting in the death sentence in Ireland.

Considering how Kyteler and her followers were the first people to be condemned for witchcraft in Ireland, this case set the precedent for how all following witchcraft and heresy cases would be executed. The act of burning witches in Ireland lasted until 1895.

References in media
"Lady Kyteler" figures in William Butler Yeats' poem "Nineteen Hundred and Nineteen":

The Stone, a novel about the times of Alice Kyteler, was published in 2008, written by a Kilkenny woman named Claire Nolan. A musical version of The Stone, based on Nolan's book, premiered in Kilkenny in 2011.

Robin Morgan wrote a novel, The Burning Time, (Melville House, 2006) about Alice Kyteler.

A short story by Emma Donoghue, 'Looking for Petronilla', tells the story of Alice Kyteler and her maid. The story appears in the collection The Woman Who Gave Birth to Rabbits (Virago, 2002).

The Kyteler Witch is a novel that explores the relationship between Petronella de Meath and her employer Lady Alice Kyteler, written by Candace Muncy Poole, 2014.

The trial is mentioned in Umberto Eco's novel The Name of the Rose in a conversation between William of Baskerville and Abo the abbot.

The feminist art piece by Judy Chicago, The Dinner Party, features a place setting for Petronella de Meath. The plate features the image of a book, a candle, a bell, and a cauldron. All of these items are encapsulated by fire.

The trial is mentioned in papal chaplain Martin of Troppau's Chronicles of Popes and Emperors.

See also
 Kyteler's Inn – a pub in Kilkenny which markets itself using Kyteler's name
 List of fugitives from justice who disappeared
 List of serial killers before 1900

References

Further reading
 Brennan, James, 'Bishop Ledrede and the trial of Alice Kyteler: a case study in witchcraft and heresy in medieval Kilkenny' in John Bradley, Diarmuid Healy and Anne Murphy (eds), Themes in Kilkenny's history: a selection of lectures from the NUI Maynooth – Radio Kilkenny academic lecture series 1999 (Kilkenny, 2000), 37–46
 Davidson, L. S. and J. O. Ward, The sorcery trial of Alice Kyteler (1993)
 Flood, John, 'Hidden in his story: the ladies of Kilcash' in Journal of the Butler Society, 4:2 (2000), 280–291
 Neary, Anne, 'The origins and character of the Kilkenny witchcraft case of 1324', Proceedings of the Royal Irish Academy, 83C (1983), 333–50
 Poole, Candace Muncy, The Kyteler Witch (2014)

External links
 Great Events from History: The Middle Ages – Lady Alice Kyteler Found Guilty of Witchcraft
 Alice Kyteler, convicted witch
 Cats and Witchcraft

1280 births
14th-century deaths
14th-century Irish people
14th-century Irish women
Fugitives
Fugitives wanted by Ireland
Heresy in Christianity in the Middle Ages
Kilkenny (city)
Mariticides
People convicted of witchcraft
People from County Kilkenny
Place of death missing
Suspected serial killers
Violence against men in Europe
Year of death missing